Balazar (or Balasar) is one of the seven parishes of the municipality of Póvoa de Varzim. The population in 2011 was 2,543, in an area of 11.61 km².

Each year thousands of pilgrims and many other tourists visit the Sanctuary of Blessed Alexandrina of Balazar.

History
It was an ecclesiastical parish in Barcelos until 1836, when it became a civil unit and transferred to Póvoa de Varzim. In 1853 it was transferred to Vila Nova de Famalicão, but Póvoa de Varzim town hall request it to be returned, and was transferred back to Póvoa two years later.

The parish became famous in 2004, after the beatification of Alexandrina Maria da Costa by Pope John Paul II, on April 25 of that year. Pilgrimages to the parish's church where Alexandrina's body rests was already common, became more popular and the church is studying if it will make a shrine to Alexandrina, depending on number of pilgrims and if she is declared a saint.

Geography
Balazar is located 14 km east of downtown Póvoa de Varzim; and borders Rates to the west and the municipalities of Barcelos, Vila Nova de Famalicão, and Vila do Conde.

Localities
The parish is divided into several localities (lugares or localidades): Agrelos, Além, Bouça Velha, Calvário, Caminho Largo, Casal, Covilhã, Cruz, Escariz, Fontaínhas, Gandra, Gestrins, Gresufes, Guardinhos, Lousadelo, Matinho, Monte Tapado, Outeiro, Quinta, Telo, Terra Ruim, Vela, and Vila Pouca.

See also
 First Thursdays Devotion

References

External links
 Civil Parish of Balazar 
 Sanctuary of Balazar 

Parishes of Póvoa de Varzim